Cry Cry Cry was a folk supergroup, consisting of Richard Shindell, Lucy Kaplansky, and Dar Williams. The band released a single eponymous album of cover songs on October 13, 1998.

The trio toured in 1999 to support the album. The tour was met with very favorable reviews.

Cry Cry Cry contributed one song to the folk-tribute album Bleecker Street: Greenwich Village in the 60's, covering Tom Paxton's "The Last Thing on My Mind". The three also joined together to cover Buddy and Julie Miller's "My Love Will Follow You" on Shindell's solo album, Somewhere Near Paterson, and to provide backing vocals for the song "Blue Shadows" on Jimmie Dale Gilmore's album (produced by Buddy Miller), "One Endless Night".

They performed on Sunday, June 18, 2017, at the Hudson River Clearwater Festival for their first show in 18 years, according to a comment at the show by Dar Williams. 

In 2021, the band released a live recording on Bandcamp of their final shows from the 2018 reunion tour, recorded at The Freight and Salvage in Berkeley, CA.

Album 

The album, Cry Cry Cry was a great success on folk music radio. Based on playlists sent to FolkDJ-L, it ranked as the fourth most played album by folk music DJs in 1998, the fifth most played in 1999, and remained in the top 250 through 2002.

Track listing
 "Fall on Me" (Bill Berry, Peter Buck, Mike Mills, Michael Stipe) 2:56
 "Cold Missouri Waters" (James Keelaghan) 4:32 (based on the Mann Gulch fire)
 "Speaking With the Angel" (Ron Sexsmith) 3:58
 "The Kid" (Buddy Mondlock) 5:39
 "Shades of Gray" (Robert Earl Keen) 4:58
 "Lord, I Have Made You a Place in My Heart" (Greg Brown) 3:34
 "By Way of Sorrow" (Julie Miller) 3:03
 "Memphis" (Cliff Eberhardt) 4:46
 "Northern Cross" (Leslie Smith) 2:55
 "Down by the Water" (Jim Armenti) 3:12
 "I Know What Kind of Love This Is" (Nerissa Nields) 4:25
 "The Ballad of Mary Magdalen" (Richard Shindell) 5:22

Credits
 Jay Bellerose – Percussion, Drums
 Larry Campbell – Guitar (Acoustic), Fiddle, Guitar, Mandolin, Pedal Steel, Arranger, Lap Steel Guitar, Guitar (Electric Fingerpicked)
 Cry Cry Cry – Vocal Arrangement
 Cliff Eberhardt – Guitar
 Richard Gates – Bass
 Jon Herington – Guitar
 Jeff Hill – Bass, Bass (Upright)
 Lucy Kaplansky – Vocals, Harmony Vocals
 Billy Masters – Guitar (Electric)
 Chuck Parrish – Guitar (Acoustic)
 Doug Plavin – Percussion, Drums
 Michael Rivard – Bass, Fretless Bass, Bass (Upright)
 Richard Shindell – Guitar (Acoustic), Vocals, Harmony Vocals
 Alan Williams – Organ, Percussion, Arranger, Guitar (Electric), Producer
 Dar Williams – Vocals, Harmony Vocals
 Darleen Wilson – Producer
 Stephanie Winters – Cello, Treated Cello

Notes and references

External links
 "Trio pays tribute to melancholy songs" by Ben Wener, Calgary Herald December 30, 1998
 "Catching up with Cry Cry Cry" by Ralph DiGennaro, The New York Times Magazine, January, 1998

American folk musical groups
Folk music supergroups
Musical groups established in 1998